Sheikh Abdul Hossein Amini was a Shia scholar, traditionist, theologian and jurist. He is best known for his book Al-Ḡadīr fi’l-Ketāb wa’l-Sonna wa’l-Adab .

Birth
He was born in the city of Sarab near the Ardabil. His father Mirza Ahmad Amini, and his grandfather Najaf Ali were jurists of the city.

Education
His teachers included Abul Hasan Esfahani, Muhammad Hosein Na'ini, and Muhammad Hossein Esfahani.

Works 
Abdul Hussain established a library in Najaf and named it “Amir al-Mo’menin”. He wrote many books and treatises, most of which have been published. He wrote books about Shiʿite beliefs, Hadith and jurisprudence. Some of his books are:
 Al-Ḡadīr fi’l-Ketāb wa’l-Sonna wa’l-Adab. An encyclopedic work which examines the tradition of Ghadir-e-Khumm
 Sīratonā wa sonnatonā sīrato nabīyenā wa sonnatoho()
 Commentary on Fatiha surah
 Martyrs of virtues
 Consequences of Trips
 Rayaz al Ons
 Exalted intention
 A treatise on intention
 Annotation of “Kamel al-Ziyarat” (written by Ibn Quluyeh Qomi)
 Annotation of the two works of Sheikh Murteza Ansari: Makasib (The earnings) and Rasayel (The treatises).

Death 
He fell ill in 1968 and travelled to Tehran for medical treatment where he died on 3 July 1970. His body was returned to Najaf for burial next to Amīr-al-moʾmenīn library that he had founded.

References

1902 births
1970 deaths
Iranian ayatollahs
Iranian male writers
People from Sarab, East Azerbaijan